Lifeline is a small rescue boat, formerly an inshore fisheries research vessel of the Fisheries Research Services currently seized by Maltese authorities due to disputed ownership, ship classification, home port documentation and flag registration.
The captain,  appeared in a Maltese court charged with commanding an improperly registered ship and was released on a 10,000-euro bail.

History
Clupea was commissioned in 1968. Measuring 32 m (100 ft) and drawing 3.5 m (11 ft 6 in), she is a good size for conducting research inside the constricted space of a sea loch. For research in offshore areas and the North Sea, the larger, more modern,  was used.

Clupea was replaced by  after the latter's launch in 2008. She has been sold to a private company.

Clupea

As Clupea she was equipped with winches, reel drums and an A-frame, allowing her to tow a range of fishing gear. Deck cranes allow the deployment of water sampling equipment and benthic grabs.

She was based at the port of Fraserburgh and operated mainly on the Scottish west coast on behalf of the Scottish Executive.

As a small vessel requiring space for equipment and laboratories, Clupea had only accommodation for four officers, six crew and six scientists.

As Sea-Watch 2

In 2015 Clupea was sold to the German NGO Sea-Watch, who  started a civil sea rescue service for refugees and migrants in the Mediterranean. The vessel was renamed Sea-Watch 2 in March 2016 and has been used for search and rescue (SAR) missions.

As Lifeline
In autumn 2016, the NGO Sea Watch sold the ship to Mission Lifeline e.V., a service club based in Dresden. Its name now is Lifeline.  
In June 2018, the Lifeline (with 239 migrants on board) was in the media as one of the ships being forbidden to enter an Italian harbour. Matteo Salvini, then Italian Minister of the Interior (Conte Cabinet), had ordered this blocking.

Netherlands Minister Cora van Nieuwenhuizen declared in late June 2018, that the Lifeline does not operate under the Netherlands flag. According to the statement, the existing registration of the vessel with the Koninklijk Nederlands Watersport Verbond was only a proof of ownership, which did not make the Netherlands the flag state for the Lifeline. The Lifeline was impounded by the Maltese authorities in summer 2018. In January 2020, captain Claus-Peter Reisch had his conviction for entering Maltese waters 'without the necessary registration or licence' quashed and a €10,000 fine revoked.

References

Research vessels of the United Kingdom
Fishing vessels of the United Kingdom
Ships built in Aberdeen
Ships built by Hall, Russell & Company
1968 ships